Capel Lofft (sometimes spelled Capell; 14 November 1751 – 26 May 1824) was a British lawyer, writer and amateur astronomer.

Life
Born in London, he was educated at Eton College, Peterhouse, Cambridge. He trained as a lawyer at Lincoln's Inn, where he was called to the bar (qualified as a barrister) in 1775. In addition to his legal practice, he became a prolific writer on the law and political topics. In politics, he was an advocate of parliamentary and other reforms, identifying with the Foxite Whig faction. He also engaged in voluminous correspondence with prominent authors.

His legal career was ended by a case in Stanton, Suffolk. On the night of 3 October 1799, Sarah Lloyd, a 22 year old servant, was incited by a suitor to steal 40 shillings. She was caught, tried, and sentenced to death by hanging. Capel Lofft fought strenuously but unsuccessfully for a reprieve. Lloyd was to be executed on 23 April 1800 in Bury St Edmunds. Lofft accompanied the cart transporting Lloyd on that morning, holding an umbrella over Lloyd to shield her from rain, and remained by her side until she was hanged. The authorities took a dim view of Lofft's fight on Lloyd's behalf, and he was struck off the Roll (list of qualified lawyers).

Lofft wrote the preface to poet and former Quaker Thomas 'Clio' Rickman's An Ode, in Celebration of the Emancipation Of The Blacks of Saint Domingo, November 29, 1803. He commended Toussaint Louverture – "of whom Posterity will know how to speak" – and hoped that "a Nation [Haiti] which has emerged into Freedom should prove itself capable and worthy of the blessings [sic] by its use of it".  He became the patron of Robert Bloomfield, the author of The Farmer's Boy, and was responsible for the publication of that work. Byron, in a note to his English Bards and Scotch Reviewers, ridiculed Lofft as "the Maecenas of shoemakers and preface-writer general to distressed versemen; a kind of gratis accoucheur to those who wish to be delivered of rhyme, but do not know how to bring forth."

Lofft had an interest in astronomy and is known to have observed several transits and eclipses. These include the transits of Mercury on 7 May 1799 and 9 November 1802, the solar eclipses on 16 June 1806 and 19 November 1816, and the lunar eclipses on 4 December 1797 and 10 June 1816.

The deaths of Lofft's father and uncle in 1811 left him with a large property and family estate. A supporter of Napoleon, he wrote letters to the editor of the Morning Chronicle (31 July and 10 August 1815) opposing the Government's decision to send Napoleon to St Helena. Lofft attempted to serve a writ of habeas corpus (a legal instrument against wrongful imprisonment) while the captive Napoleon was being held aboard a ship in Plymouth.

In 1816 Lofft moved to Europe for his daughters' education. He died in 1824 at Montcalieri, near Turin.

Family
Lofft married Anne, daughter of Henry Emlyn, in 1778. Their fourth son Capell Lofft the younger (1806–1873), was also a writer. An "editor, Tory Socialist and High Church Anglican who likes a drink, a pie and a hearty rendition of “God Save the Queen,” appears currently in The Critic (London) under the name Capel Lofft.

References

1751 births
1824 deaths
Alumni of Peterhouse, Cambridge
People educated at Eton College
English abolitionists
English barristers